Security Attribute Modulation Protocol (SAMP) is a protocol used to encode role-based and user-based access control attributes for transmission over a network, typically embedded in a TCP/IP or UDP/IP packet, with an application layer payload trailing afterwards.

Sun Microsystems makes a brief mention of SAMP in their Trusted Solaris 8 administration manuals. In the case of Trusted Solaris 8, the Trusted Network Daemon parses SAMP headers and manages system security in conjunction with other security provisions on the system.

Computer network security